Juvenilia is a compilation album by the New Zealand group The Verlaines, released in 1987 by Flying Nun Records. It collects the band's early singles and EPs on CD. Juvenilia was the first Verlaines album to be released on CD.

Track listing
"Death And The Maiden"
"Doomsday"
"Joed Out"
"Baud To Tears"
"Crisis After Crisis"
"Burlesque"
"You Cheat Yourself Of Everything That Moves"
"Pyromaniac"
"Windsong"
"Angela"
"You Say You"
"New Kind Of Hero"
"Instrumental"
"Phil Too?"
"C.D Jimmy Jazz And Me"

References 

The Verlaines albums
Flying Nun Records compilation albums
1987 compilation albums